"Here We Go" is a pop song written by Warren Morgan. It was recorded by Australian pop singer John Paul Young. The song was released in May 1977 as the second single from Young's third studio album, Green (1977). The song peaked at number 43 on the Kent Music Report.

Track listing 
7" (AP 11424) 
Side A "Here We Go" - 3:39
Side B "Shake That Thing" - 4:49

Weekly charts

References 

1977 songs
1977 singles
John Paul Young songs
Song recordings produced by Harry Vanda
Song recordings produced by George Young (rock musician)
Albert Productions singles